, is a Japanese pop singer.

Background 
Tanimura was raised mainly in Osaka. She moved frequently between Osaka and Hawaii between the ages of 3 and 8, after which she also stayed for an extended period of time in Los Angeles.

Tanimura was enrolled in the College of Law at Aoyama Gakuin University and graduated in March 2010.

She is married to three-weight world champion boxer Kazuto Ioka.

Career 
In her third year of high school, Tanimura caught the attention of music production agents at an event in Osaka.  In 2007, her first singles, "Again" and "Say Good-Bye" were released under Avex Group's Sonic Groove label. The singles peaked at No. 55 and No. 105 on the Oricon charts, respectively. In 2008, Tanimura released the singles "Jungle Dance" and "If I'm Not the One / Sexy Senorita". They peaked at No. 15 and No. 8 on the Oricon charts, respectively.

In 2010, she was chosen to sing the official theme songs of the game Hokuto Musō. The songs were released as part of "Far Away / Believe You" on March 24, 2010.

Discography

Albums

Singles

External links 

 Official site
  Avex profile
 Official blog

1987 births
Living people
Japanese television personalities
Japanese women pop singers
Aoyama Gakuin University alumni
Avex Group artists
Musicians from Osaka
Musicians from Sapporo
21st-century Japanese singers
21st-century Japanese women singers